Marsh Lake (Lingít: Kóoshdaa Xágu) is an unincorporated community on the Alaska Highway on the shores of Marsh Lake southeast of Whitehorse in Canada's Yukon. The area was organized in 2001, as a local area council to help the residents with some form of municipal government.

Communities
The municipal boundary of the community of Marsh Lake extends along the Alaska Highway from the Yukon River bridge east of Whitehorse to include all of the residential areas up to Judas Creek along the Alaska Highway. Some of these residential subdivisions are generally referred to by their own names:
Army Beach
North M'Clintock
South M'Clintock
M'Clintock Valley Road
Judas Creek
Scout Bay
M'Clintock Place
Grayling Place
Old Constabulary
New Constabulary

Demographics 

Services
Part of the Whitehorse Census Agglomeration, Marsh Lake is a residential area most of whose residents work and do their business in Whitehorse. Originally a cottage community, the ease of the commute and the provision of power and phone has made it possible to start living in the community year-round, although many seasonal residences still exist.

The area is served by a volunteer fire and rescue service, as well as 911 calling for other emergency services out of Whitehorse.

References

External links
 Marsh Lake Community Site
 Marsh Lake Local Advisory Council

Unincorporated communities in Yukon
Yukon River